Janina is a Polish nobility clan coat-of-arms. Borne by several noble families descended in the-male line from the medieval lords of Janina (the eponyms of the clan) or legally adopted into the clan upon ennoblement.

History

Janina is the only coat of arms represented on the sky as constellation - Scutum. It was created by Johannes Hevelius in 1684, and originally named it Scutum Sobiescianum (the shield of Sobieski) to commemorate the victory of the Polish forces led by King John III Sobieski in the Battle of Vienna in 1683. Later, the name was shortened to Scutum.

Blazon
The coat of arms was used in a variety of tinctures and designs, varying greatly from family to family. All of them depicted what is described in the alternative names for the Janina, that is a "field in a field" or a "shield within a shield".

Notable bearers
Most notable bearers of this coat of arms include:

 members of the Sobieski family, including King Jan III Sobieski and Katarzyna Sobieska (pictured)

Gallery
Variations

Cities and Villages

Notes and references

Bibliography
 Tadeusz Gajl: Herbarz polski od średniowiecza do XX wieku : ponad 4500 herbów szlacheckich 37 tysięcy nazwisk 55 tysięcy rodów. L&L, 2007, s. 406–539. .

See also
 Scutum (constellation)
 Polish heraldry
 Heraldic family
 List of Polish nobility coats of arms

External links
The Sobieskis' Janina Coat of Arms at the Wilanów Palace Museum
  
  

Polish coats of arms